Germany participated in the Eurovision Song Contest 2008 with the song "Disappear" written by Remee, Thomas Troelsen and Hanne Sørvaag. The song was performed by No Angels. The German entry for the 2008 contest in Belgrade, Serbia, was selected through the national final Wer singt für Deutschland?, organised by the German broadcaster ARD in collaboration with Norddeutscher Rundfunk (NDR). The national final took place on 6 March 2008 and featured five competing acts with the winner being selected through two rounds of public voting. "Disappear" performed by No Angels was selected as the German entry for Belgrade after gaining 50.5% of the vote in the second round.

As a member of the "Big Four", Germany automatically qualified to compete in the final of the Eurovision Song Contest. Performing in position 4, Germany placed twenty-third out of the 25 participating countries with 14 points.

Background 

Germany has won the contest on one occasion: in 1982 with the song "Ein bißchen Frieden" performed by Nicole. Germany, to this point, has been noted for having competed in the contest more than any other country; they have competed in every contest since the first edition in 1956 except for the 1996 contest when the nation was eliminated in a pre-contest elimination round. In 2006, the German entry "No No Never" performed by Texas Lightning placed fourteenth out of twenty-four competing songs scoring 36 points.

The German national broadcaster, ARD, broadcasts the event within Germany and delegates the selection of the nation's entry to the regional broadcaster Norddeutscher Rundfunk (NDR). NDR confirmed that Germany would participate in the 2008 Eurovision Song Contest on 26 September 2007. Since 1996, NDR had set up national finals with several artists to choose both the song and performer to compete at Eurovision for Germany. On 22 December 2007, the broadcaster announced that they would organise a multi-artist national final to select the German entry.

Before Eurovision

Wer singt für Deutschland? 
Wer singt für Deutschland? (English: Who sings for Germany?) was the competition that selected Germany's entry for the Eurovision Song Contest 2008. The competition took place on 6 March 2008 at the Schauspielhaus in Hamburg, hosted by Thomas Hermanns. Five acts competed during the show with the winner being selected through a public televote. The show was broadcast on Das Erste as well as online via the broadcaster's Eurovision Song Contest website eurovision.de. The national final was watched by 3.47 million viewers in Germany.

Competing entries 

Five acts were selected by an expert panel consisting of representatives of record companies and the entertainment department for NDR. Each act was also supported by a celebrity which consisted of Marc Bator (news anchor for Tagesschau), Katja Ebstein (1970, 1971 and 1980 German Eurovision entrant), Kim Fisher (singer and presenter), Oliver Pocher (comedian) and Tetje Mierendorf (actor). The five participating acts were announced on 10 January 2008.

Final 
The televised final took place on 6 March 2008. The winner was selected through two rounds of public voting, including options for landline and SMS voting. In the first round of voting, the top two entries were selected to proceed to the second round. The top two entries were: "Hinterm Ozean" performed by Carolin Fortenbacher and "Disappear" performed by No Angels. In the second round, the winner, "Disappear" performed by No Angels, was selected. In addition to the performances of the competing entries, 2007 German Eurovision entrant Roger Cicero as well as former winners of the Eurovision Song Contest Charlotte Perrelli (1999), Ruslana (2004), Marija Šerifović (2007) performed their respective entries.

At Eurovision 
According to Eurovision rules, all nations with the exceptions of the host country and the "Big Four" (France, Germany, Spain and the United Kingdom) are required to qualify from the semi-final in order to compete for the final; the top ten countries from the semi-final progress to the final. As a member of the "Big 4", Germany automatically qualified to compete in the final on 24 May 2008. In addition to their participation in the final, Germany is also required to broadcast and vote in one of the two semi-finals. During the semi-final allocation draw on 28 January 2008, Germany was assigned to broadcast and vote in the first semi-final on 20 May 2008. The running order for the final in addition to the semi-final was also decided through the allocation draw, and Germany was subsequently drawn to perform in position four, following Albania and preceding Armenia. At the conclusion of the final, Germany placed twenty-third in the final, scoring 14 points which included 12 points from Bulgaria.

In Germany, the two shows were broadcast on Das Erste which featured commentary by Peter Urban, and the final was broadcast on hr3 which featured commentary by Tim Frühling and on NDR 2 which featured commentary by Thomas Mohr. The German spokesperson, who announced the top 12-point score awarded by the German televote during the final, was Thomas Hermanns.

Voting 
Below is a breakdown of points awarded to Germany and awarded by Germany in the first semi-final and grand final of the contest, and the breakdown of the voting conducted during the two shows. Germany awarded its 12 points both in the first semi-final and the grand final of the contest to Greece.

Points awarded to Germany

Points awarded by Germany

References 

2008
Countries in the Eurovision Song Contest 2008
Eurovision
Eurovision